Alfred Pierre Marie Chupin (13 August 1916 – 26 July 2021) was a French politician.

Biography
The son of a trader in Brest, Chupin trained as an engineer and became a pilot in the French Air Force. He owned a plumbing and heating business prior to entering politics, inspired by Charles de Gaulle.

Chupin was elected Mayor of Brest in 1947, following great success by other Rally of the French People (RPF) politicians. In 1951, he was elected to the National Assembly for Finistère, still a member of the RPF. During his mandate, he moved to the centre-left and joined the Democratic and Socialist Union of the Resistance (USDF) following the dissolution of the RPF in 1953. That year, he failed to be re-elected as Mayor of Brest, losing to Popular Republican Movement candidate .

Chupin supported Pierre Mendès France and his policies, moving further away from his previous Gaullist ideals with his support of the Treaty establishing the European Defence Community.

In 1956, Chupin lost his seat in the National Assembly, earning only 3.2% of the vote. He never returned to politics.

Alfred Chupin died in Formentera on 26 July 2021 at the age of 104.

References

1916 births
2021 deaths
Men centenarians
French centenarians
20th-century French politicians
Deputies of the 2nd National Assembly of the French Fourth Republic
Rally of the French People politicians
Democratic and Socialist Union of the Resistance politicians
Rally of Left Republicans politicians
French Air and Space Force personnel
Mayors of places in Brittany
Politicians from Brest, France